Stupid Thing or Stupid Things may refer to:

"Stupid Thing" (Aimee Mann song), 1993
Stupid Thing, a 1993 album by Bob Schmidt
"Stupid Thing", a 1993 song by Paul Quinn & The Independent Group
Stupid Things (Keane song), 2019
"Stupid Things" (Yo La Tengo song), 2012
 "The Stupid Things", a song by Jesse McCartney from the 2004 album Beautiful Soul
"Dumme Sache" ('Stupid thing'), a 2019 song by Die Ärzte

See also
 Stupid Things That Mean the World, a 2015 album by Tim Bowness